Francesco Clemente (born 23 March 1952) is an Italian contemporary artist. He has lived at various times in Italy, India and New York City. Some of his work is influenced by the traditional art and culture of India. He has worked in various artistic media including drawing, fresco, graphics, mosaic, oils and sculpture. He was among the principal figures in the Italian Transavanguardia movement of the 1980s, which was characterised by a rejection of Formalism and conceptual art and a return to figurative art and Symbolism.

Life 
Clemente was born in 1952 in Naples, in Campania in southern Italy. In 1970 he enrolled in the faculty of architecture of the Sapienza, the university of Rome, but did not complete a degree there. In Rome he came into contact with contemporary artists such as Luigi Ontani and Alighiero Boetti, who had come to the city at about the same time, and also with the American Cy Twombly, who lived there. Boetti, who was ten years older, became both a friend and a mentor; in 1974 they visited Afghanistan together. With Ontani, Clemente gave performances at the Galleria L'Attico. Despite his close involvement with these artists associated with the Arte povera movement, and his interest in others such as Pino Pascali and Michelangelo Pistoletto, Clemente preferred to work on paper. He made ink drawings of dreams and recollections of his childhood, and in 1971, in his first solo show, exhibited collages at the Galleria Giulia in Rome.

In 1973 Clemente made the first of many visits to India. He established a studio in Madras (now Chennai), and became interested in both the religious and folk traditions of India and in the traditional art and crafts of the country. In 1976 and 1977 he visited the library of the Theosophical Society of Madras to study the religious texts there. In 1980 and 1981 he worked on Francesco Clemente Pinxit, a series of twenty-four gouaches on antique hand-made rag paper, in collaboration with miniature painters from Orissa and Jaipur. In 1982 he moved to New York City.. He lives in Greenwich Village.

Work 

Clemente's work has been widely shown. His early large canvases, painted in 1981–1982, were exhibited in 1983 at the Whitechapel Gallery in London and then in Germany and Sweden. In 1986 the John and Mable Ringling Museum of Art in Sarasota, Florida, mounted a travelling exhibition of his work. Clemente participated in the Biennale di Venezia in 1988, 1993, 1995 and 1997; in documenta in Kassel, Germany, in 1992 and 1997; and in the Whitney Biennial, also in 1997. Solo shows were held at the Philadelphia Museum of Art in 1990; at the Sezon Museum of Modern Art in Tokyo in 1994; at the Galleria d'Arte Moderna of Bologna in 1999; at the Solomon R. Guggenheim Museum in New York in 2000; at the Museo Archeologico Nazionale di Napoli in Naples in 2002–2003; at the Irish Museum of Modern Art in Dublin in 2004; at Palazzo Sant'Elia in Palermo, in Sicily, in 2013; at both the Coro della Maddalena in Alba and Santa Maria della Scala in Siena in 2016; and at the NSU Art Museum in Fort Lauderdale, Florida, in 2017.

In 1998 his work was used in the film Great Expectations, directed by Alfonso Cuarón.

See also 
 265924 Franceclemente, asteroid

References

Further reading 

 Seidel, Max. Francesco Clemente: The Tarots. Hirmer Publishers. 2012. 
 Clemente, Francesco; Hollein, Max and Walcott, Derek. Francesco Clemente: Palimpsest. Moderne Kunst Nürnberg. 2012. 
 Danto, C. Artur. Francesco Clemente: The Sopranos. Charta. 2008. 
 Clemente, Francesco; Walcott, Derek. Francesco Clemente: Three Rainbows. Charta. 2009. 
 Clemente, Francesco; Danto, Arthur. Francesco Clemente: A Private Geography. Charta. 2011. 
 Jain, Jyotindra. Clemente: Made in India. Charta. 2011. 
 Ammann, Jean- Christophe; Clemente, Francesco. Francesco Clemente: Works 1971–1979. Charta. 2007. 
 Matthews, Harry. Singular Pleasures. Dalkey Archive Press. 1999. 
 Clemente, Francesco. Francesco Clemente. Charta. 2000. 
 Babini, Luca. Francesco Clemente: Art and Life. Aperture Foundation. 1999. 
 Rushdie, Salman. Francesco Clemente: Self Portraits. Gagosian Gallery. 2005. 
 Clemente, Francesco. Polaroids, Celebrities and Self-Portraits. Jablonka Galerie. 2001. 
 Fahey, David; Clemente, Francesco. Sante D'Orazio: A Private View. Prestel Publishing. 2006. 
 Clemente, Francesco. India. Twelvetrees Press. 1989. 
 Rimanelli, David. Francesco Clemente Paintings 2000–2003. Gagosian Gallery. 2003. 
 Clemente, Francesco. Francesco Clemte: Fifty One Days at Mount Abu.  D'Offay, Anthony Gallery. 1999. 
 Fischl, Eric; Ammann, Jean-Christophe; Young, Geoffrey; Clemente, Francesco. Eric Fischl: It's Where I look...It's How I See... Their World, My World, The World. Mary Boone Gallery/ Jablonka Gallery. 2009. 
 Auping, Michael. Francesco Clemente. Abrams, Harry N., Inc. 1985. 
 Colombo, Paulo. Francesco Clemente. Electa. 2006. 
 Avedon, Elizabeth. Francesco Clemente. Knopf Publishing Group. 1987. 
 Katz, Vincent. Life Is Paradise: The Portraits of Francesco Clemente. Powerhouse Books. 1999. 
 McLure, Michael. Francesco Clemente Testa Coda. Rizzoli. 1992. 
 Percy, Ann. Francesco Clemente: Three Worlds. Rizzoli. 1990. 
 Percy, Ann. Francesco Clemente: Three Worlosi. Philadelphia Museum of Art. 1998. 
 Warner, Marina. Francesco Clemente: The Book of the Sea. Gagosian Gallery. 2002. 
 Shapiro, David. Francesco Clemente. Parkett Verlag AG. 1986. 
 Valli, Giambattista. Giambattista Valli. Rizzoli. 16 October 2012. 
 Denninson, Lisa. Clemente: A Retrospective. Abrams, Harry N., Inc. 1999. 
 Crone, Rainer. Francesco Clemente: Pastelle 1972–1983 Prestel Verlag GmbH & Co KG. 1984.
 Eccher, Danilo. Francesco Clemente. Allemandi, Umberto & Company. 1999. 
 Walcott, Derek. A Conversion, exhibition catalogue. Deitch Projects, New York, Edizioni Charta, Milano 2009.
 Rushdie, Salman. Being Francesco Clemente, in: Francesco Clemente: Self Portraits, exhibition catalogue. New York: Gagosian Gallery, 2006. Pages .
 Kort, Pamela. Francesco Clemente in Conversation with Pamela Kort, New York, 26 March 2011; in: Francesco Clemente, Palimpsest, exhibition catalogue. Schirn Kunsthalle, Frankfurt, 2011.

1952 births
Living people
Artists from Naples
Italian contemporary artists
20th-century Italian painters
20th-century Italian male artists
Italian male painters
Italian emigrants to the United States
Italian watercolourists
People from Greenwich Village
Transavanguardia
Neo-expressionist artists